Parasoft SOAtest is a testing and analysis tool suite for testing and validating APIs and API-driven applications (e.g., cloud, mobile apps, SOA). Basic testing functionality include functional unit testing, integration testing, regression testing, system testing, security testing, simulation and mocking, runtime error detection,  web UI testing,  interoperability testing,  WS-* compliance testing, and  load testing.

Supported technologies include Web services, REST, JSON, MQ, JMS, TIBCO, HTTP, XML, EDI, mainframes, and custom message formats.

Parasoft SOAtest introduced Service virtualization via server emulation and stubs in 2002; by 2007, it provided an intelligent stubs platform that emulated the behavior of dependent services that were otherwise difficult to access or configure during development and testing. Extended service virtualization functionality is now in Parasoft Virtualize, while SOAtest provides intelligent stubbing.

SOAtest is used by organizations such as Cisco, IBM, HP, Fidelity, Bloomberg, Vanguard, AT&T, IRS, CDC, Tata Consultancy Services, Comcast and Sabre.

It was recognized as a leader in the Forrester Research's The Forrester Wave™: Modern Application Functional Test Automation Tools, Q4 2016, which evaluated 9 functional test automation tool vendors across 40 criteria. Forrester Research gave SOAtest the highest score among all vendors in the Current Offering category, citing its strength in API testing, UI automation, and key integrations.  It also part of the solution recognized as "innovation and technology leader" in Voke's service virtualization market mover array.

SOAtest was recognized as a leader by Forrester in the 2018 Forrester Wave Omnichannel Functional Test Tools.  The report said "Parasoft shined in our evaluation specifically around effective test maintenance, strong CI/CD and application lifecycle management (ALM) platform integration".

In 2018 SOAtest won an award for "Best in DevOps APIs" in the 2018 API Awards from API:WORLD.

References

External links
Parasoft SOAtest.
API Testing (solution featuring Parasoft SOAtest)
Service Virtualization (related service virtualization product)

Computer security software
Load testing tools
Security testing tools
Software testing tools
Static program analysis tools
Unit testing frameworks
Web service development tools